Baltasar Lobo (22 February 1910 - 4 September 1993) was  a Spanish artist, anarchist and sculptor best known for his compositions depicting mother and child.

Life
Born in Cerecinos de Campos, Zamora, Spain, he moved to Paris, France in 1939 where his sculpting would be influenced by Constantin Brâncuși and Jean Arp. Lobo's art was exhibited at the Galerie Vendôme on the Rue de la Paix along with notables such as Henri Matisse, Fernand Léger, Maurice Utrillo and Pablo Picasso.

Work
Baltasar Lobo was one of the artists who contributed to the Ciudad Universitaria de Caracas project and did the illustrations for the English translation of Platero y Yo by Juan Ramón Jiménez. In 1984, he received Spain's National Award for Plastic Arts.

Museum
Baltasar Lobo died in 1993 and was buried in Paris in the Cimetière du Montparnasse. The Museo Baltasar Lobo (museum) is in the city of  Zamora, Spain near his birthplace.

References

1910 births
1993 deaths
People from the Province of Zamora
Spanish sculptors
Spanish male sculptors
Spanish illustrators
Burials at Montparnasse Cemetery
20th-century sculptors